Miqdaad ibn Amr al-Bahrani, better known as al-Miqdaad ibn al-Aswad al-Kindi or simply Miqdaad, was one of the companions of the Islamic prophet Muhammad. His kunya was Abu Ma'bad. Miqdaad was born in Eastern Arabia. He became fugitive in his hometown and ran to Mecca, where he served Aswad al-Kindi. Miqdaad managed to gain favor of his master, who in turn adopted him as his son.

Miqdaad later embraced Islam and became one of the early converts of the new religion founded by Muhammad, before he migrated to Medina due to persecution by the Meccan polytheists. Miqdaad stopped using 'Ibn Aswad' as his name and used his real bloodline nisba from his fater, 'Ibn Amr', after Qur'anic verse was revealed to forbid one to abolish his own bloodline. In Medina, Miqdad was known in history as brave companion of Muhammad and stated by Muslim historians as the first Muslim horsemen, Miqdaad participated in all military operations under Muhammad.

After the death of Muhammad, Miqdad continued to serve Islam under the Rashidun, where he was involved heavily in the Muslim conquest of the Levant and later Muslim conquest of Egypt. Miqdad's funeral prayer was led by the caliph.

Biography 
Miqdad was born in Hadhramaut, Yemen to Amr al-Bahrani. He left for Mecca after an incident between him and one of the fellow tribesmen namely Abu Shammar ibn Hajar al-Kindi caused him to become fugitive and run away from his home to Mecca. In Mecca, he served a man named al-Aswad ibn Abd al-Yaghuts al-Kindi, who several times impressed his master and caused al-Aswad to grant favor on him and later adopted him as son, thus caused Miqdad to be more known as al-Miqdad ibn Aswad al-Kindi rather than al-Miqdad ibn Amr.

Under Muhammad 
When Islam was revealed by Muhammad, Miqdad was among the first seven persons who embraced Islam although he hid his new faith from Aswad ibn Abd al-Yaghuts. He later performed the migration to Medina with fellow Muslims to escape the persecutions from the Quraysh tribe. When the Muslims migrated to Medina, Miqdad and Utbah ibn Ghazwan pretended to follow the Meccan polytheists in their effort to chase the Muslims. However, as they caught up with a group of Muslim Muhajirs who escaped Mecca, Miqdad and Utbah immediately broke up with the Meccan and instead joined the Muslims in their escape to Medina.

During the battle of Badr, Miqdad is the only Muslim who rode a horse, while others either rode camels or walked. Miqdad commanded the left flank of Muslim army during this battle. However, in another sources it is recorded that in fact at least three horsemen participated in the Muslim forces, which are Miqdad, Zubayr ibn al-Awwam, and Marthad ibn abi Marthad. The horse owned by Miqdad was named Ba‘zajah Before the battle, Miqdad spoke to the Prophet by quoting Qur'an:

After the battle of Badr, Miqdad and Zubayr both received double the normal soldier's spoils of war due to their participation in battle riding a horse.

Later, In the battle of Uhud, he was said to serve as an archer Later in the battle of Dhu Qarad when Banu Ghatafan under Abdurrahman al-Faraji came to raid Medina, he along Akhram and Abu Qatadah fought against Abdurrahman al-Faraji. Akhram died in this battle but Miqdad and Abu Qatada manage to avenge their leader and caused the army of Abdurrahman to flee. This record is also found in Waqidi Kitabul Maghazi Up until the death of Muhammad, Miqdad attended all the battles of the Prophet.

For sometimes during his life, Miqdad married with Duba'ah bint Zubayr, one of Muhammad's relative.

During the Caliphate of Umar 
During the first siege of Emesa Miqdad participated as commander of Bali tribe division. Miqdad was known to have participated in this siege under Abu Ubaidah ibn al-Jarrah. During the campaign in Levant, Miqdad also served as Quran reciter of the army of Rashidun caliph Abu Bakr This tradition was recorded to be continued on to the time of caliph Umar in battle of Yarmouk, where Miqdad was tasked by Khalid bin al-Walid to recite Quranic verses from Al-Anfal to the rear guards which were led by Said ibn Zayd to boost their morale before the battle Miqdad then was sent by caliph Umar to Egypt during the Muslim conquest of Egypt to aid 'Amr ibn al As as the latter asked for reinforcements, where caliph Umar praised Miqdad in his letter to Amr that Miqdad being equal to 1,000 soldiers in strength

According to Waqidi, during Miqdad's campaign aiding Amr, the Rashidun under Miqdad pacified several areas in al-Gharbia region, starting from Kafr Tanah (area in modern day Dakahlia Governorate), and Tennis. Then Miqdad continued his march leading forty horsemen which included Dhiraar ibn al-Azwar. Then as they reached Damietta, Miqdad found the city was fortified by a man named al-Hammuk, an uncle of Al-Muqawqis. Al-Hammuk fortified the city and closed the gates, as Miqdad besieged the city. As Damietta subdued, Miqdad were appointed to govern the city. The siege continued until the defender of Damietta, Shata, the son of Hammuk, agreed to surrender and converted to Islam. As Shata now converted to Islam, Miqdad now appointed him to lead the army to conquer the province of Sah, the fortresses in Ashmoun, Lake Burullus, and Dumayra. However, Shata later fell in battle during the capture of Tina castle.

Later, during the siege of Oxyrhynchus in south of Egypt, Miqdad, Zubayr ibn al-Awwam, Dhiraar ibn al-Azwar and others, leading about 10,000 Companions of the Prophet, with 70 among them were veterans of battle of Badr. They besieged the city for 4 months as Miqdad leading 200 horsemen, while Zubayr ibn Al-Awwam lead 300 horsemen, then Dhiraar, Abdullah ibn Umar, and Uqba ibn Amir al-Juhani  each leading 200 horsemen. the Byzantines and their Copt allies showering the Rashidun army, until the overcame the defenders, as Dhiraar, the first emerge, came out from the battle with his entire body covered in blood, while confessed he has slayed about 160 Byzantine soldiers during the battle. Then, the city of Oxyrhyncuhus was renamed into "al-Bahnasa" after being subdued by Rashidun army.

At some point during Umar's reign, when Miqdad in Medina, along with Zubayr, and the caliph's son, Abdullah ibn Umar, went to Khaybar to collect their profit share as they have shareholding of the properties and plantations in Khaybar, which were managed and worked by the Jewish tribes of Khaybar, who had been subdued during the time of Muhammad. However, the Jews in Khaybar refused and instead hurt Abdullah ibn Umar, who suffered broken hand from their harassment. This prompted caliph Umar to expel the entire Jewish tribe from Khaybar, as now the properties in Khaybar were fully owned by the Muslim overlords.

During the Caliphate of Uthman 
After the death of caliph Umar, Miqdad pledge his allegiance to Uthman who had just ascended as caliph. During the reign of caliph Uthman, Miqdad participated in further conquest of Africa where Miqdad was sent along with Abdullah bin Al-Zubayr, Abdullah bin Amr bin Al-Aas, Abdullah bin Abbas, as well as Abu Dhar Al-Ghafari, Miswar bin Makhrama to face the Byzantine army under Gregory in the battle of Sufetula.

Later, Miqdad , Shaddad ibn Aws and Ubadah ibn al-Samit joined the first caliphate naval armada built by Muawiyah to the Conquest of Arwad island in the offshore of Tartus. The mariners that conquered the island of Arwad under Muawiyah later continued their venture to the island of Cyprus. several authorities reported Miqdad was also among this naval enterprise to Cyprus. They departed from Acre.

According to Mahmud Shakir, the armada of Miqdad, Mu'awiyah, and Ubadah met with the naval forces from Africa which were led by Abdallah ibn Sa'd, who arrived in Cyprus before them. Then they joined their forces until they subdued the island of Cyprus from Byzantine garrisons. The Rashidun naval forces pacified almost every Byzantine garrison; which is supported by the evidence of two Greek inscriptions in the Cypriot village of Solois that cite the occurrence of first and second conquest of Cyprus, with around fifty small raids occurred in between. The entire island of Cyprus surrendered for the first time after their capital, Salamis, was surrounded and besieged for an unspecified time.

Before the canonization of Quran codex into one Mushaf under jurisdiction of caliph Uthman, the Qira'at of Miqdad is the one which was adhered by Muslims in Levant, particularly in Homs During his stay in Homs, Miqdad teaching Qur'an in the city.

Later life and death 
As he was dying, Miqdad asked Zubayr ibn al-Awwam to manage and sell one of his estates which was left to his two children. Hasan ibn Ali and Husayn ibn Ali, each getting 18,000 dirhams from the endowment, while from the remainder he also asked Zubayr to give each of Muhammad's wives 7,000 dirhams.

Miqdad died in 33 AH in Damascus and is buried there. However, Tabari recorded that Miqdad was buried in al-Jurf, a place three miles west of Medina where the caliph Uthman led the ritual prayer of his death.

Personal characteristic 
His skin was dark and his hair was a lot. Miqdad had a dyed beard and wide eyes while his nose was hooked.

Miqdad were known as master of archery.

Scholarship legacy 

Hadith that is transmitted by Miqdad became guidance rulings for Muslim scholars to formulate Sharia laws. Shafiʽi school Madhhab scholars cite the Hadith from Ali for the rule of war to take physical action against enemy of the State, based on when Miqdad and Zubayr were brought together with Ali on the instruction from Muhammad to pursue and capture Meccan polytheist spy who are on the way to inform the enemy regarding Muslims strategy. This ruling were codified in Kitab al-Umm which is authored by Al-Shafi'i.

Ibn Hajar al-Asqalani recorded in his book regarding the rulings from hadith, Fath al-Bari, the Sunnah which is practiced by Miqdad to throw mud or dust towards the face of flatterers or sychophants. The practice and encouragement of such conduct were also listed by Muhammad al-Bukhari in his book regarding ethics and manners towards peoples who gave praise excessively, which being responded with mud thrown by Miqdad.

In modern time, Muğdat Mosque was built a large mosque in Mersin, Turkey in honor of Miqdad as early Sahabah.

See also
 Aswad (name)
 Sunni view of the Sahaba
 Muğdat Mosque
Muslim conquest of the Levant

Notes

References

Bibliography

Further reading
https://referenceworks.brillonline.com/entries/encyclopaedia-of-islam-2/al-mikdad-b-amr-SIM_5191?s.num=3&s.f.s2_parent=s.f.book.encyclopaedia-of-islam-2&s.q=%CA%BFAmr+b.+al-%CA%BF%C4%80%E1%B9%A3+al-Sahm%C4%AB

Muhajirun
Sahabah who participated in the battle of Badr
Sahabah who participated in the battle of Uhud
Sahabah hadith narrators
Generals of the Rashidun Caliphate
People of the Muslim conquest of the Levant
Muslim conquest of Egypt
Arab people of the Arab–Byzantine wars
People from the Rashidun Caliphate
Arab generals
Year of birth missing
652 deaths
Kinda